Admiral Farragut Academy, established in 1933, is a private, college-prep school serving students in grades K-12. Farragut is located in St. Petersburg, Florida in Pinellas County and is surrounded by the communities of Treasure Island, Gulfport, Pasadena, Tierra Verde, and Seminole. Farragut also serves North Pinellas County, which includes the communities of Clearwater, Belleair, and Palm Harbor.

History
Founded in 1933 on the banks of the Toms River in Pine Beach, New Jersey, Admiral Farragut Academy was a college prep school named after Admiral David Glasgow Farragut, the first American naval officer to rise to that rank. Over Farragut's first 12 years, the school became so popular that a second campus was purchased in 1945 on the shores of Boca Ciega Bay in St. Petersburg, Florida. Since then, the school has undergone many changes, such as accepting day students, becoming co-ed, and adding an elementary school.

The school's New Jersey campus in Pine Beach closed at the end of the 1994 school year after financial difficulties.

Notable alumni

Two of the 12 men who walked on the Moon graduated from Admiral Farragut:
 Rear Admiral Alan Shepard, USN, was the first American in space and, in 1971, became the fifth person to walk on the Moon as part of the Apollo 14 mission. Shepard graduated in 1941 from the New Jersey campus.
 Brigadier General Charles Duke, USAF, was a 1953 graduate of the St. Petersburg campus and, in 1972, became the tenth person to walk on the Moon as part of the Apollo 16 mission. In the spring of 2006, NASA presented a Moon rock to General Duke, who then donated it to the school. It is displayed in a showcase in front of the Quarter-Deck at the entrance to the main building, Farragut Hall.
Other notable alumni:
 William Colepaugh, who defected to the Nazis during World War II, and returned to spy for Germany against the United States.
 Actor Lorenzo Lamas graduated in 1975 from the New Jersey campus.
 Actor Casper Van Dien graduated from the St. Petersburg, FL campus and later performed in many films, of which Starship Troopers is the most notable.
 Chef Spike Mendelsohn, class of 2000, competed on both Top Chef and Top Chef: All Stars. Spike is the owner of "Good Stuff Eatery," a restaurant with locations on Capitol Hill and in Georgetown in the District of Columbia, as well as in the Crystal City business neighborhood of northern Virginia.
 Major Megan McClung, one of the first female students at the Academy in 1990 and the first female United States Marine Corps officer killed in combat during the Iraq War
 Animator/Producer Andy Luckey attended from 1980-'81 at St. Petersburg but transferred before graduation.
 Lieutenant General Sidney "Tom" Weinstein, ‘52N, was the Army Deputy Chief of Staff for Intelligence during the 1980s. He is recognized as the principal architect of the modern service intelligence corps, and was the crucial player in its expansion and professionalization.
 Richard W. Fisher '67N, President of the Federal Reserve Bank of Dallas since 2005
 William N. Small, New Jersey campus; United States Navy Admiral, former Vice Chief of Naval Operations
 Stephen Stills attended as child, before he left for Woodrow Wilson Junior High in nearby Tampa.
 Tom Thompson '68S, NCAA football record holder.
 Paul F. Gleason, served as Grand Master of Masons in Massachusetts from 2017 to 2019.
 Robert A. Jensen, 1983 graduate, an American writer and crisis management expert.

The NJROTC Program
An integral part of an education at Admiral Farragut Academy is the required involvement in NJROTC. Every eighth-grade student in the Upper School takes one year of Naval Science–an in-depth study of the history, operation and core concepts of the United States Navy. Upper School students may join the NJROTC program and continue taking Naval Science courses.

Student body
There are approximately 500 students in K-12th grade with a 3:1 ratio of boys to girls. There are 330 students in the Upper School and approximately 50% of the Upper School students are boarding students.

References

 
Academy
Alan Shepard
Charles Duke
Preparatory schools in Florida
Educational institutions established in 1933
High schools in Pinellas County, Florida
Private high schools in Florida
Private middle schools in Florida
Private elementary schools in Florida
1945 establishments in Florida